Grey Highlands Secondary School is a Grade 9-12 high school located in Flesherton, Ontario, Canada, in rural Grey County. It was built in 1967.

Early history

Grey Highlands Secondary School (GHSS) was built in 1967 as one of the many new school construction projects undertaken by Education Minister Bill Davis in order to modernize and centralize rural elementary and secondary schools. When it opened in September 1968, it became the central high school for students from three smaller district high schools, covering a collection area of 195,000 hectares (750 square miles). Those smaller high schools were converted to elementary schools, which in turn replaced the many one- and two-room school houses that were still in operation until that time.

Until that time, the curriculum and facilities in Ontario's rural high schools were designed solely for academic students destined for post-secondary education. Students needing a level of education necessary for the trades, business or a non-academic career inevitably dropped out of high school.

E. Murray Juffs, the first principal of Grey Highlands and the main driving force behind the design of the school, envisioned Grey Highlands as a multi-discipline school encompassing opportunities for education in all streams, from occupational training as a car mechanic or short-order cook, to business office training, to a liberal arts education suitable for university preparation.

Incidents

The area around Flesherton is in a snow belt region, and winter storms from Lake Huron and Georgian Bay can cause several "snow days" each year, when buses cannot safely deliver students. While this is not a problem when students are forced to stay home, there is always the question of whether to send students home early when a daytime storm threatens. This problem was not anticipated in the first winter of operation (1968–69), when a sudden storm stranded the entire student body and staff at the school, forcing them to spend the night in the gymnasium and auditorium. Procedures were developed to try to avoid this, including a barograph in the office of then Head of Science W.J. Brown that would warn of sudden drops in barometric pressure. Despite this, there was another forced sleepover twenty years later, on February 8, 1989, when 130 students had to stay at the school overnight due to an unexpected storm.

Notable alumni
Matt Galloway (graduated 1989), CBC radio personality
Chris Neil (graduated 1996), NHL hockey player
Oliver Schroer (graduated 1974), award-winning fiddler and recording artist

See also
List of high schools in Ontario

Footnotes

External links
 Grey Highlands Secondary School

High schools in Ontario
School buildings completed in 1967
Schools in Grey County
1967 establishments in Ontario
Educational institutions established in 1967